The Electoral division of Roland was an electoral division in the Tasmanian Legislative Council of Australia. It existed for two years from 1997 to 1999 and never faced an election. The seat was a renaming of the old seat of Tamar, which was then renamed Rowallan.

Members

See also
Tasmanian Legislative Council electoral divisions

References
Past election results for Roland

Former electoral districts of Tasmania
1999 disestablishments in Australia